Walter John Campbell Murray was born in Seaford, East Sussex 20 August 1900. During the First World War he spent time at sea as a radio officer in the Mercantile Marine and later served in the R.A.F. He was a journalist in London for a short time before moving to Horam in Sussex to spend a year gathering and marketing wild herbs.
Murray later became a schoolmaster, and in 1926 founded his own independent co-educational school of which he remained headmaster for forty years.
Throughout his life he was a keen student of natural history, and this took him to many remote corners and islands of the United Kingdom.
Murray was well known as a nature photographer, as well as a radio and television broadcaster. He died in January 1985.

Bibliography

Nature's Undiscovered Kingdom, George Allen and Unwin Ltd, 1946
Copsford, George Allen and Unwin Ltd, 1948; Tartarus Press 2019 , and Little Toller Books 2019. 
A Sanctuary Planted, Phoenix House Ltd, 1953
Romney Marsh, Robert Hale, 1953
with L. Hugh Newman:
Stand and Stare, Staples Press, 1950
Nature's Way: Questions and Answers on Animal Behaviour, Country Life, 1952
Wander and Watch, Staples Press, 1954

References

External links
 'Copsford and Walter Murray' by Tom Wareham
 'Walter Murray: An Unacknowledged English Nature Mystic'
 'Copsford: Walter Murray' by Mark Valentine
 The Cottage in the Weald: Walter Murray and Copsford by Tom Wareham

1900 births
1985 deaths
English nature writers
20th-century naturalists
English naturalists
20th-century Royal Air Force personnel
20th-century British journalists
English male journalists
People from Seaford, East Sussex
Nature photographers